Adamjee Literary Award, also known as Adamjee Prize, is a literary award bestowed by the  government of Pakistan. It is presented by the president. The award seeks to recognize those people who have made "meritorious contribution" to the literature of Pakistan. It was first introduced by Pakistan Writers' Guild in 1959. Muhammad Shahidullah served as the permanent chairman of the award.

List of winners

References

Civil awards and decorations of Pakistan
Pakistani literature
Bengali literary awards
Urdu literary awards
Pakistani literary awards